The International Journal of Nursing Studies is a monthly peer-reviewed nursing journal published by Elsevier. It publishes original research and scholarship about health-care delivery, organisation, management, workforce, policy and research methods relevant to in the fields of nursing, midwifery and related health professions.

History
The journal was established in 1963 and was originally published on a quarterly basis by Pergamon Press. The founding editor-in-chief was Elsie Stevenson (University of Edinburgh). She was succeeded in 1968 by K. J. W. Wilson (University of Edinburgh, later University of Birmingham). Wilson stepped down in 1982 and was replaced by Rosemary Crow (Northwick Park Hospital) and Caroline Cox (University of London). Cox stepped down in 1992, and Crow (then at the University of Surrey), remained as sole editor-in-chief for a further eight years, a total of 18 years making her the longest-serving editor to date. From 2000-2004, Jenifer Wilson-Barnett (King's College London) was editor. She was succeeded in 2005 by the present editor Ian Norman.

Abstracting and indexing 
The journal is indexed in major databases including: 

 Social Sciences Citation Index
 Science Citation Index Expanded
 EmCare
 Current Contents - Social & Behavioral Sciences
 Psychology Abstracts
 PubMed/MEDLINE
 CINAHL
 ASSIA
 Scopus
 British Nursing Index
 CISTI
 CIRRIE

According to the Journal Citation Reports, in 2020 the journal's impact factor was 5.837, with a 5-Year Impact Factor of 6.847, ranking first out of 122 journals in the category "Nursing".

References

External links

Publications established in 1963
Monthly journals
General nursing journals
Elsevier academic journals
English-language journals